Gladys Cardiff (born 1942) is a poet and academic, with interests in Native American, African-American and American literature. She was an associate professor at Oakland University from 1999 to 2013.

Early life 
Cardiff was born in Browning, Montana. She is of Irish and Welsh descent on her mother's side, and she is descended from the Eastern Band of Cherokee Indians on her father's side. She makes use of her cultural heritage in her work, referencing especially Cherokee place names in her poetry.

She attended the University of Washington, where she studied with Theodore Roethke.

Published works 
Cardiff won the 1976 Washington State Governor's Award for her first book of poetry, To Frighten a Storm. She published A Bare Unpainted Table in 1999. She received awards from the Seattle Arts Commission in 1985 and 1986. "In 1988 she was a co-recipient of the University of Washington's Louisa Kerns Award for literary endeavors."  Her poetry has been featured by The Poetry Foundation.

References

External links
Staff page at Oakland University

1942 births
Living people
Oakland University faculty
Poets from Montana
Native American women writers
Native American poets
People from Browning, Montana
Cherokee writers
Native American academics
American women academics
20th-century Native American women
20th-century Native Americans
20th-century American women writers